Xu Yingming (born 22 January 1992) is a Chinese fencer. He won one of the bronze medals in the men's team sabre event at the 2018 Asian Games held in Jakarta, Indonesia. Four years earlier, he also won one of the bronze medals in the same event at the 2014 Asian Games held in Incheon, South Korea. He has also won medals at several editions of the Asian Fencing Championships.

He competed in the men's sabre event at the World Fencing Championships in 2014, 2015, 2018 and 2019.

References

External links 
 

Living people
1992 births
Place of birth missing (living people)
Chinese male sabre fencers
Fencers at the 2014 Asian Games
Fencers at the 2018 Asian Games
Medalists at the 2014 Asian Games
Medalists at the 2018 Asian Games
Asian Games bronze medalists for China
Asian Games medalists in fencing
Fencers at the 2020 Summer Olympics
Olympic fencers of China
21st-century Chinese people